() is a municipality and village in Frýdek-Místek District in the Moravian-Silesian Region of the Czech Republic. It has about 2,100 inhabitants.

Polish minority makes up 17.0% of the population.

Etymology

The name of Nýdek was probably derived from the personal name Nidek.

Geography
Nýdek lies in the historical region of Cieszyn Silesia on the border with Poland. It is located in the Silesian Beskids mountain range.

The Hluchová River flows through the municipality.

History

The first written mention of Nýdek is from 1430, when Bolesław I, Duke of Cieszyn donated this territory to Nidek, who founded here a settlement. The first mention of the settlement is from 1456. Politically the village belonged then to the Duchy of Teschen that was a fee of the Kingdom of Bohemia, which after 1526 became part of the Habsburg monarchy.

After 1540s Protestant Reformation prevailed in the Duchy of Teschen and later local Lutherans built a wooden church here (it was not built earlier by Catholics). It was taken from them (as one from around fifty buildings) in the region by a special commission and given back to the Roman Catholic Church on 21 March 1654.

From the 15th century until 1792, Nýdek was owned by the Gočálkovský family. In 1770, iron ore was discovered here, which caused population growth and development of the village. Nýdek was bought by Teschener Kammer in 1792 for 46,000 florins.

After Revolutions of 1848 in the Austrian Empire a modern municipal division was introduced in the re-established Austrian Silesia. Nýdek as a municipality was subscribed to the political district of Teschen and the legal district of Jablunkau. According to the censuses conducted in 1880–1910 the population of the municipality grew from 1,567 in 1880 to 1,747 in 1910 with a majority being native Polish-speakers (between 94.7% and 97.7%) accompanied by German-speaking (at most 74 or 4% in 1900) and Czech-speaking people (at most 17 or 0.9% in 1880). In terms of religion in 1910 the majority were Protestants (93.6%), followed by Roman Catholics (86 or 4.9%), Jews (7 or 0.4%) and 19 others.

After World War I, Polish–Czechoslovak War and the division of Cieszyn Silesia in 1920, it became a part of Czechoslovakia. Following the Munich Agreement, in October 1938 together with the Zaolzie region it was annexed by Poland, administratively adjoined to Cieszyn County of Silesian Voivodeship. It was then annexed by Nazi Germany at the beginning of World War II. After the war it was restored to Czechoslovakia.

Sport

Nýdek has a tradition of winter sports. In 1933, a ski jumping hill was built here, which still works today.

Sights
The most important historical monument is the Church of Saint Nicholas, built in 1576.

An observation tower is located on the Velká Čantoryje hill.

Notable people
Aniela Kupiec (1920–2019), Polish poet

Gallery

References

External links

Villages in Frýdek-Místek District
Cieszyn Silesia